Classic Rotors is a flying aviation museum specializing in helicopters and other rotorcraft, located at the Ramona Airport in Ramona, California, United States.

History
The museum was founded in 1992 by Mark DiCiero, after he built and learned to fly his own helicopter. The museum is a non-profit and all-volunteer organization, with no paid staff. The museum currently has five helicopters in flying condition, which are flown in air displays.

The museum describes its mission as being:

Collection 

 Adams-Wilson Hobbycopter
 Aérospatiale Alouette III
 Aérospatiale SA 341G Gazelle
 Air & Space 18A
 Bell 47
 Bell 47G
 Bell 47G
 Bell 47G
 Bell 47J
 Bell UH-1N Iroquois
 Bensen B-8
 Boeing Vertol CH-46 Sea Knight
 Bölkow Bo 102
 Brantly 305
 Cessna 172M
 Convertawings A Quadrotor
 de Lackner 125
 DuPont Aerospace DP-1
 Eagle Helicycle
 Goodyear GA-400R Gizmo
 Gyrodyne QH-50 DASH
 Helipod
 Hiller 1094 Camel
 Hiller UH-12
 Hiller YH-32 Hornet
 Hiller YH-32 Hornet
 Hughes 269
 Hughes OH-6 Cayuse
 Hughes RWV
 Jovair YH-30
 Kaman HOK
 Kaman HUK
 Kamov Ka-26
 Kelly Ranger II
 McCulloch J-2
 Mil Mi-2
 Monte-Copter Model 15 Triphibian
 Piasecki H-21
 Piasecki H-25
 Piasecki HRP Rescuer
 Piasecki HUP-3
 Pressure Jet
 PZL M28 Skytruck
 Revolution Mini-500
 Robinson R22
 Robinson R44
 RotorWay Exec
 Rotorway 133 Scorpion
 Sikorsky CH-37 Mojave
 Sikorksy H-34J
 Sikorsky HH-52 Seaguard
 Sikorsky S-52
 Sikorsky S-55
 SNCASO SO.1221 Djinn
 Westland Wasp

See also
American Helicopter Museum, Pennsylvania, USA
The Helicopter Museum, Somerset, England
Hubschraubermuseum Bückeburg, Germany
List of aerospace museums

References

External links

Aerospace museums in California
1992 establishments in California
Museums established in 1992
Museums in San Diego County, California